Leslie Raymond Peterson, CM, OBC (6 October 1923 – 14 April 2015) was a lawyer, politician, and university chancellor in West Vancouver, British Columbia, Canada.

He was born in Viking, Alberta, the son of Herman S. Peterson, a native of Norway. Peterson was called to the British Columbia bar in 1949 and set up practice in Vancouver. In 1950, he married Agnes Rose Hine.

In 1956, he was first elected to the Legislative Assembly for Vancouver Centre and served for just under 17 consecutive years.

He served in the provincial cabinet as Minister of Education and Minister of Labour and then was Attorney General of British Columbia from 1968 to 1972.

In 1978 he first became a member of the Board of Governors of University of British Columbia. He was elected the University's Chancellor in 1987.

He was appointed to the Order of British Columbia in 1990.

He was also appointed a Member of the Order of Canada in 2000.

References

1923 births
2015 deaths
British Columbia Social Credit Party MLAs
Chancellors of the University of British Columbia
Members of the Order of British Columbia
Attorneys General of British Columbia
Members of the Order of Canada
People from Beaver County, Alberta
Canadian people of Norwegian descent